Ivan Šipajlo was a Czechoslovak bobsledder who competed in the late 1940s. At the 1948 Winter Olympics in St. Moritz, he finished 14th in the four-man event.

References
1948 bobsleigh four-man results
Bobsledding four-man results: 1948-64

External links
  

Olympic bobsledders of Czechoslovakia
Bobsledders at the 1948 Winter Olympics
Czechoslovak male bobsledders
Possibly living people
Year of birth missing